Nyikoa is a monotypic genus of Central African cellar spiders containing the single species, Nyikoa limbe. It was first described by B. A. Huber in 2007, and is only found in Africa.

See also
 List of Pholcidae species

References

Monotypic Araneomorphae genera
Pholcidae
Spiders of Africa